In December 2019, the International Union for Conservation of Nature (IUCN) listed 8460 least concern avian species. Of all evaluated avian species, 76.9% are listed as least concern. 
No subpopulations of birds have been evaluated by the IUCN.

This is a complete list of least concern avian species evaluated by the IUCN. Where possible common names for taxa are given while links point to the scientific name used by the IUCN.

Penguins

Procellariiformes
Procellariiformes includes petrels and albatrosses. There are 54 species in the order Procellariiformes assessed as least concern.

Procellariids

Oceanitids

Storm petrels

Gruiformes
There are 98 species in the order Gruiformes assessed as least concern.

Cranes

Rallids

Other Gruiformes species

Grebes

Bustards

Parrots
There are 226 parrot species assessed as least concern.

Cockatoos

Psittacids

Ciconiiformes

Suliformes
There are 34 species in the order Suliformes assessed as least concern.

Frigatebirds

Cormorants

Sulids

Darters

Pigeons and doves

Pelecaniformes
There are 82 species in the order Pelecaniformes assessed as least concern.

Threskiornithids

Herons

Pelicans

Hamerkops
Hamerkop

Galliformes
There are 186 species in the order Galliformes assessed as least concern.

Cracids

Megapodes

Phasianids

New World quails

Guineafowl species

Struthioniformes
There are 38 species in the order Struthioniformes assessed as least concern.

Tinamous

Other Struthioniformes species

Bucerotiformes
Bucerotiformes includes hornbills, hoopoe and wood hoopoes. There are 46 species in the order Bucerotiformes assessed as least concern.

Hoopoes
Hoopoe
Madagascar hoopoe

Hornbills

Wood hoopoes

Accipitriformes
Accipitriformes includes most of the diurnal birds of prey. There are 163 species in the order Accipitriformes assessed as least concern.

Accipitrids

Ospreys
Osprey

Anseriformes
There are 126 species in the order Anseriformes assessed as least concern.

Anatids

Screamers
Horned screamer
Southern screamer

Anseranatids
Magpie goose

New World vultures

Owls
There are 160 owl species assessed as least concern.

Barn-owls

Strigidae

Charadriiformes
There are 276 species in the order Charadriiformes assessed as least concern.

Oystercatchers

Auks

Sandpipers

Buttonquails

Recurvirostrids

Charadriids

Glareolids

Gulls

Stone-curlews

Jacanas

Skuas

Other Charadriiformes species

Falconiformes

Coraciiformes
Coraciiformes includes kingfishers and bee-eaters. There are 137 species in the order Coraciiformes assessed as least concern.

Ground rollers
Pitta-like ground roller

Alcedinidae

Motmots

Rollers

Bee-eaters

Todies

Passerines
There are 4808 passerine species assessed as least concern.

Monarch flycatchers

Finches

Pittas

Formicariids

White-eyes

Mimids

Broadbills

Nuthatches

Cotingas

Vangas

Thrushes

Starlings

Drongos

Corvids

Tapaculos

Bushshrikes

Antbirds

Icterids

New World warblers

Ovenbirds

Sylviids

Emberizids

Shrikethrushes

Old World babblers

Wrens

Old World orioles

Leafbirds

Old World flycatchers

Ploceids

Bird-of-paradise species

Malurids

Gnatcatchers

Motacillids

Bulbuls

Tanagers

Flowerpeckers

Manakins

Cuckooshrikes

Swallows

Tyrant flycatchers

Larks

Rhipidurids

Woodcreepers

Vireos

Cardinals

Sunbirds

Honeyeaters

Cisticolids

Shrikes

Wattle-eyes

Estrildid finches

Acanthizids

Petroicids

Rail-babbler species

Waxwings

Bowerbirds

Treecreepers

Tits

Pachycephalids

Accentors

Sparrows

Aegithalids

Viduids

Penduline tits

Artamids

Cinclosomatids

Australasian treecreepers

Gnateaters

Cracticids

Orthonychids

Melanocharitids

Australo-Papuan babblers

Regulids

Other passerine species

Caprimulgiformes
There are 491 species in the order Caprimulgiformes assessed as least concern.

Owlet-nightjars

Frogmouths

Hummingbirds

Nightjars

Swifts

Treeswifts

Potoos

Oilbirds
Oilbird

Cuckoos

Trogons

Piciformes
There are 404 species in the order Piciformes assessed as least concern.

Capitonids

Semnornithids
Prong-billed barbet

Toucans

Woodpeckers

Jacamars

Honeyguides

Megalaimids

Puffbirds

Lybiids

Turacos

Gaviiformes

Mousebirds

Tropicbirds

Sandgrouse species

Other bird species

See also 
 Lists of IUCN Red List least concern species
 List of near threatened birds
 List of vulnerable birds
 List of endangered birds
 List of critically endangered birds
 List of extinct bird species since 1500
 List of data deficient birds

References 

Birds
Least concern birds
Least concern birds